Hugh Kennedy was the 27th mayor of New Orleans (March 21, 1865 – May 5, 1865 and June 28, 1865 – March 18, 1866), and also a journalist and businessman.

Notes

External links
https://web.archive.org/web/20101201234813/http://www.lahistory.org/site28.php

Mayors of New Orleans
Louisiana Democrats